A shyster is generally a charlatan, a person practising quackery or some similar confidence trick in order to obtain money or advantage by pretense.

Shyster may also refer to:

 Sylvester Shyster, a fictional villain & dictator in the Mickey Mouse universe
 SS-3 Shyster, the NATO name for the Soviet R-5 missile during the Cold War
 SHYSTER, a legal expert system
 Shyster, an enemy in Super Mario RPG